A professional driver is someone who is paid to drive a vehicle.

Types of professional driver
 Bus driver
 Chauffeur
 Delivery (commerce)
 Emergency medical technician (ambulance driver)
 Motorman (tram/streetcar driver)
 Pay driver
 Racing driver
 Taxicab driver
 Test driver
 Train driver
 Truck driver
 Pilot 
 Fleet Services Drivers

Driver

Driver
Driver
Driver